Doumer may refer to:

People
 Paul Doumer (1857–1932), French president
 René Doumer (1887–1917), French flying ace

Places
 Doumer Hill, Palmer Archipelago, Antarctica
 Doumer Island, Palmer Archipelago, Antarctica